After the Storm is the second album by jazz guitarist Norman Brown, released in 1994 on Motown Records. 
The album peaked at No. 2 on the Billboard Jazz Albums chart and No. 21 on the Billboard Top Soul Albums chart. After the Storm was also certified Gold in the US by the RIAA.

Overview
The Earth, Wind & Fire Horns section of saxophonist Gary Bias, trumpeter Raymond Lee Brown and trombonist Reggie Young played on the album.

Covers
Brown covered For the Love of You by The Isley Brothers,  Any Love by Luther Vandross and Janet Jackson's That's The Way Love Goes upon the album.

Critical reception
After the Storm won a Soul Train Award in the category of Best Jazz Album.

Track listing

Credits
Acoustic Guitar - Norman Brown
Arranged By – Crayge Lindesay, Land Richards, Norman Brown 
Arranged By [Horn Arrangement] – Norman Brown 
Arranged By [Vocal Arrangement] – Crayge Lindesay, DeNetria Champ, Lynne Fiddmont/Lindsey, Norman Brown, Steve McKeever
Art Direction – Jonathan Clark 
Backing Vocals – Lynne Fiddmont-Lindsey, Norman Brown, Arnold McCuller, Baby Lee, Bridgette B. Bryant-Fiddmont, DeNetria Champ
Bass - George Lopez, James Manning, Freddie Washington, Larry Kimpel
Composer - Norman Brown, Janet Jackson, James Harris III & Terry Lewis, Luther Vandross, Marcus Miller, Chris Jasper, Ernie Isley, Marvin Isley, Kelly Isley, Ronald Isley, Rudolph Isley
Design [Graphic Design] – Shauna Woods
Drums - Ricky Lawson, Land Richards, Alonzo "Scotter" Powell
Engineer [Assistant] – Nazeeh Islam, Richard Huredia
Executive-Producer – Steve McKeever
Mastered By – Bernie Grundman
Mixed By – Brant Biles, Malcolm Cecil, Ralph Sutton, Robert Margouleff
Photography By – James R. Minchin III
Producer – Norman Brown
Recorded By – Ralph Sutton
Recorded By [Additional Recording] – Brant Biles, Robert Margouleff 
Rhythm Guitar - Norman Brown
Written-By – Les Colter, Norman Brown

Charts

Weekly charts

Year-end charts

References

1994 albums
Norman Brown (guitarist) albums
Motown albums